Messent Peak is one of the Bristly Peaks, rising to about  just west of Brodie Peak and  southwest of Mount Castro in the central Antarctic Peninsula. It was named by the Advisory Committee on Antarctic Names in 1977 for David R. Messent, a geodesist at the U.S. Army Topographic Command (later the Defense Mapping Agency, Hydrographic/Topographic Center), Palmer Station, winter party 1969.

References

Mountains of Palmer Land